Susan Youens (born 1947) is the author of many books on German lieder. A musicologist, her work on Franz Schubert and Hugo Wolf is considered some of the most scholarly and useful material on these composers. Both musicologists and performers have often cited her work.

As well as her books, she writes program notes for vocal recitals at Carnegie Hall in New York City. A native of Houston, Texas, she is a professor at the University of Notre Dame, as well as being a frequent guest speaker.

Her twin sister, Laura Youens-Wexler (1947–2019) was also a musicologist whose work was substantially about early Lutheran music. She was a professor emerita at George Washington University and a graduate of the Indiana University Jacobs School of Music.

Her awards include the IRC Harrison Medal of the Society for Musicology in Ireland.

Books
 Franz Schubert: Die schöne Müllerin, Cambridge University Press, 1992. 123 pp. .
 Heinrich Heine and the Lied, Cambridge University Press, 2007. 378 pp. .
 Hugo Wolf and his Mörike Songs, Cambridge University Press, 2000. 203 pp. .
 Hugo Wolf: The Vocal Music, Princeton University Press, 1992. 384 pp. .
 Retracing a Winter's Journey: Franz Schubert's Winterreise, Cornell University Press, 1991. 331 pp. .
 Schubert, Müller, and Die schöne Müllerin, Cambridge University Press, 1997. 245 pp. .
 Schubert's Late Lieder: Beyond the Song Cycles, Cambridge University Press, 2002. 436 pp. .
 Schubert's Poets and the Making of Lieder, Cambridge University Press, 1996. 384 pp. .

External links
Notre Dame bio

References

1947 births
American musicologists
American women musicologists
American writers about music
Classical musicians from Texas
Living people
People from Houston
University of Notre Dame faculty
21st-century American women